"Sunflower Slow Drag" is a ragtime composition by Scott Joplin and Scott Hayden.  It is about four minutes long and has been described as "full of gaiety and sunshine".

Musical structure
Intro A A B B A Trio-Intro C C D D

While Joplin's name was given top billing, Jasen and Tichenor assert that everything except the trio was primarily Hayden's work.  The trio, attributed to Joplin, is distinguished by its softer dynamics, pentatonic emphasis, and broader range.

Publication history
The copyright was registered March 18, 1901.  The piece was originally published by John Stillwell Stark, who advertised it as "the twin sister of Maple Leaf".  Stark also reported that the trio was written during Joplin's courtship of Belle Hayden, his first wife, who was also Scott Hayden's sister-in-law, his brother's widow.

See also 
 List of compositions by Scott Joplin

References

External links 
 Sheet music and midi from Mutopia
 YouTube video of "Sunflower Slow Drag" being played
 

1901 compositions
Rags by Scott Joplin
Compositions for solo piano